11th AFCA Awards

Best Film: 
Mad Max: Fury Road

The 11th Austin Film Critics Association Awards, honoring the best in filmmaking for 2015, were announced on December 29, 2015.

Winners and nominees

References

External links
 IMDb page
 Official website

2015 film awards
2015
2015 in Texas